Selce is a former village in central Slovenia in the Municipality of Zagorje ob Savi. It is now part of the village of Tirna. It is part of the traditional region of Upper Carniola and is now included in the Central Sava Statistical Region.

Geography
Selce stands on a hill east of Tirna above the Mošenik Gorge. It is connected to Tirna by a road through the hamlet of Brezovica.

Name

The name Selce is a plural diminutive of the common noun selo 'settlement, village'. It is related to toponyms such as Selo, Sela, and Selca.

History
Selce had a population of 34 (in five houses) in 1890 and 26 (in six houses) in 1900. Selce was annexed by Tirna in 1953, ending its existence as a separate settlement.

References

External links

Selce on Geopedia

Populated places in the Municipality of Zagorje ob Savi
Former settlements in Slovenia